Christina Annika Hering (born 9 October 1994) is a German middle-distance runner specialising in the 800 metres. She represented her country at the 2015 World Championships and 2016 World Indoor Championships.

Competition record

Personal bests
Outdoor
400 metres – 52.91 (Wetzlar 2015)
800 metres – 1:59.54 (Nürnberg 2015)

Indoor
400 metres – 54.14 (Karlsruhe 2016)
800 metres – 2:00.93 (Glasgow 2016)

References

External links

 

1994 births
Living people
Sportspeople from Munich
German female sprinters
German female middle-distance runners
World Athletics Championships athletes for Germany
Olympic female middle-distance runners
Olympic athletes of Germany
Athletes (track and field) at the 2016 Summer Olympics
Universiade silver medalists for Germany
Universiade medalists in athletics (track and field)
Competitors at the 2017 Summer Universiade
Medalists at the 2019 Summer Universiade
German national athletics champions
Athletes (track and field) at the 2020 Summer Olympics